Anarchism has long had an association with the arts, particularly with visual art, music and literature. This can be dated back to the start of anarchism as a named political concept, and the writings of Pierre-Joseph Proudhon on the French realist painter Gustave Courbet. In an essay on Courbet of 1857 Proudhon had set out a principle for art, which he saw in the work of Courbet, that it should show the real lives of the working classes and the injustices working people face at the hands of the bourgeoisie.

The French novelist Émile Zola objected to Proudhon advocating freedom for all in the name of anarchism, but then placing stipulations on artists as to what they should depict in their works. This opened up a division in thinking on anarchist art which is still apparent today, with some anarchist writers and artists advocating a view that art should be propagandistic and used to further the anarchist cause, and others that anarchism should free the artist from the requirements to serve a patron and master, allowing the artist to pursue their own interests and agendas. In recent years the first of these approaches has been argued by writers such as Patricia Leighten and the second by Michael Paraskos.

Significant writers on the relationship between art and anarchism include Proudhon, Peter Kropotkin, Herbert Read, Alex Comfort, George Woodcock, David Goodway, Allan Antliff and Cindy Milstein. Despite this history of a close relationship between art and anarchism some anarchist writers such as Kropotkin and Read have argued that in an anarchist society the role of the artist would disappear completely as all human activity would become, in itself, artistic. This is a view of art in society that sees creativity as intrinsic to all human activity whereas the effect of bourgeois capitalism has been to strip human life of its creative aspects through industrial standardisation, the atomisation of production processes and the professionalisation of art through the education system.

For some writers, art and anarchism artists would not disappear as they would continue to provide an anarchist society with a space in which to continue to imagine new ways of understanding and organising reality as well as a space in which to face possible fears. This is similar to Noël Carroll's theory of the function of horror stories and films in current society: "Art-horror is the price we are willing to pay for the revelation of that which is impossible and unknown, of that which violates our conceptual schema."

Overview 
About anarchism and the arts, historian David Goodway wrote:

Anarchism had a significant influence on French Symbolism of the late 19th century, such as that of Stéphane Mallarmé, who was quoted as saying "Je ne sais pas d'autre bombe, qu'un livre." (I know of no bomb other than a book.) Its ideas infiltrated the cafes and cabarets of turn-of-the-century Paris (see the Drunken Boat #2).

Oscar Wilde’s 1891 essay "The Soul of Man under Socialism" has been seen as advocating anarchism. Oscar Wilde "stated in an interview that he believed he was ‘something of an Anarchist’, but previously said, ‘In the past I was a poet and a tyrant. Now I am an anarchist and artist.’"

Many American artists of the early 20th century came under the influence of anarchist ideas, while others embraced anarchism as an ideology. The Ashcan School of American realism included anarchist artists, as well as artists such as Rockwell Kent (1882–1971) and George Bellows (1882–1925) who were influenced by anarchist ideas. Abstract expressionism also included anarchist artists such as Mark Rothko and painters such as Jackson Pollock, who had adopted radical ideas during his experience as a muralist for the Works Progress Administration. Pollock's father had also been a Wobbly.

David Weir has argued in Anarchy and Culture that anarchism only had some success in the sphere of cultural avant-gardism because of its failure as a political movement; cognizant of anarchism's claims to overcome the barrier between art and political activism, he nevertheless suggests that this is not achieved in reality. Weir suggests that for the "ideologue" it might be possible to adapt "aesthetics to politics", but that "from the perspective of the poet" a solution might be to "adapt the politics to the aesthetics". He identifies this latter strategy with anarchism, on account of its individualism. Weir has also suggested that "the contemporary critical strategy of aestheticizing politics" among Marxists such as Fredric Jameson results from the demise of Marxism as a state ideology. "The situation whereby ideology attempts to operate outside of politics has already pointed Marxism toward postmodernist culture, just as anarchism moved into the culture of modernism when it ceased to have political validity".

Late 20th century examples of anarchism and the arts include the collage works by James Koehnline, Johan Humyn Being, and others whose work was being published in anarchist magazines such as Anarchy: A Journal of Desire Armed and Fifth Estate. The Living Theatre, a theatrical troupe headed by Judith Malina and Julian Beck, were outspoken about their anarchism, often incorporating anarchistic themes into their performances.

In the 1990s, anarchists became involved in the mail art movement – "art which uses the postal service in some way". This relates to the involvement of many anarchists in the zine movement. Some contemporary anarchists make art in the form of flyposters, stencils, and radical puppets.

Visual art

19th-century realism 
Visual art was considered one of the most important aspects of anarchist activity from the birth of anarchism, with Pierre-Joseph Proudhon writing on his friend and contemporary Gustave Courbet in the essay "Du Principe de l'art", published 1865, that 'The task of art is to warn us, to praise us, to teach us, to make us blush by confronting us with the mirror of our own conscience.' Courbet also went on to paint Proudhon on several occasions. Similarly Courbet wrote in 1850:

Impressionism and Neo-Impressionism 
Among the Impressionists the artist Camille Pissarro is known to have had strong anarchist sympathies which led him to recommend to his children that they change their surnames to avoid being associated with his political beliefs. Pissarro's anarchism brought him into contact with the younger artists who formed the Neo-Impressionist group, particularly Paul Signac, Henri-Edmond Cross, Charles Angrand, Théo van Rysselberghe and Maximillien Luce, who were active in anarchist circles, particularly those of the political activist Jean Grave, who encouraged other anarchist activists to embrace the potential of art to further their cause. In their collaborations they established a tripartite relationship between art and anarchism, still debated to this day, in which the artist could be employed for direct propagandistic purposes, or could show images of the true condition of the proletariat, or, more controversially, envision future realities towards which an anarchist revolution might aspire. It is in this latter context that the bucolic images of the south of France by artists such as Cross and Signac should be viewed as anarchist paintings.

Cubism and futurism 

Patricia Leighten has shown that Spanish cubist painter Juan Gris was an artist with strong anarchist sympathies, although she argues this is only evident in his overtly political cartoons. She suggests his cubist still lives, deliberately eschewed anarchist subject matter so that he 'self-consciously drained his paintings of political import, avoiding such anarchist subjects as prostitutes and neutralised his radical style'. However, drawing on the principle established by Neo-Impressionist artists such as Cross and Signac, that anarchist art can also involve visualising alternative realities for an anarchist society, Michael Paraskos has criticised this reading of Gris's paintings, saying that this form of anarchism seems to demand that 'artists conform to a predetermined template to define their work as radical. Cartoons of prostitutes are anarchist; paintings of bottles, playing cards and fruit are not.'

Though typically not associated with futurism, anarchism had some minor influence on Futurism. Carlo Carrà's best known work was The Funeral of the Anarchist Galli, painted in 1911. In the 1912 catalogue for the Futurists' first Parisian exhibition Umberto Boccioni remarked "the sheaves of lines corresponding to all the conflicting forces, following the general law of violence" which he labeled force lines encapsulating the Futurist idea of physical transcendentalism. Mark Antliff has suggested that this futurist aesthetic was "designed to involve the spectator in the very politics that led to Italy's intervention in World War I and, ultimately, to the rise of Fascism in Italy". The art historian Giovanni Lista has identified this aesthetic as first appearing in the anarcho-syndicalist current, where Marinetti encountered the Sorelian "myths of action and violence".

The individualist anarchist philosopher and poet Renzo Novatore belonged to the leftist section of futurism alongside other individualist anarcho-futurists such as Dante Carnesecchi, Leda Rafanelli, Auro d'Arcola, and Giovanni Governato.

Surrealism 

Surrealism was both an artistic and political movement aims at the liberation of the human being from the constraints of capitalism, the state, and the cultural forces that limit the reign of the imagination. From its origins individualist anarchists like Florent Fels opposed it with his magazine Action: Cahiers individualistes de philosophie et d'art. However faced with the popularity of surrealism Fels' magazine closed in 1922. The movement developed in France in the wake of World War I with André Breton (1896–1966) as its main theorist and poet. Originally it was tied closely to the Communist Party. Later, Breton, a close friend of Leon Trotsky, broke with the Communist Party and embraced anarchism, even writing in the publication of the French Anarchist Federation.

By the end of World War II the surrealist group led by Breton had decided to explicitly embrace anarchism. In 1952 Breton wrote "It was in the black mirror of anarchism that surrealism first recognised itself." "Breton was consistent in his support for the francophone Anarchist Federation and he continued to offer his solidarity after the Platformists around Fontenis transformed the FA into the Federation Communiste Libertaire. He was one of the few intellectuals who continued to offer his support to the FCL during the Algerian War (1954–1962) when the FCL suffered severe repression and was forced underground. He sheltered Fontenis whilst he was in hiding. He refused to take sides on the splits in the French anarchist movement and both he and Peret expressed solidarity as well with the new FA set up by the synthesist anarchists, and worked in the Antifascist Committees of the 1960s alongside the FA."

Post-war modernism 
In the period after World War II the relationship between art and anarchism was articulated by a number of theorists including Alex Comfort, Herbert Read and George Woodcock. Although each wrote from perspectives supportive of modernist art they refused to accept the position put forward by Clement Greenberg that modernist art had no political, social or narrative meaning, a view that would have curtailed an anarchist reading of modern art. In his study on the relationship between modern art and radical politics, Social Radicalism and the Arts, Donald Drew Egbert argued that in fact, modern artists were often most at home with an anarchist understanding of the position of the place of the artist in society than either a de-politicised Greenbergian or a Marxist understanding of the role of art.

Contemporary art 

In contemporary art anarchism can take diverse forms, from carnivalesque street art, to graffiti art and graphic novels, to various traditional forms of art, including painting, sculpture, video and photography.

Music 

A number of performers and artists have either been inspired by anarchist concepts, or have used the medium of music and sound in order to promote anarchist ideas and politics. French singers-songwriters Léo Ferré and Georges Brassens are maybe the first to do so, in the fifties and beyond.

Punk rock is one movement that has taken much inspiration from the often potent imagery and symbolism associated with anarchism and Situationist rhetoric, if not always the political theory. In the past few decades, anarchism has been closely associated with the punk rock movement, and has grown because of that association (whatever other effects that has had on the movement and the prejudiced pictures of it). Indeed, many anarchists were introduced to the ideas of Anarchism through that symbolism and the anti-authoritarian sentiment which many punk songs expressed.

Anarcho-punk, on the other hand, is a current that has been more explicitly engaged with anarchist politics, particularly in the case of bands such as Crass, Poison Girls, (early) Chumbawamba, The Ex, Flux of Pink Indians, Rudimentary Peni, The Apostles, Riot/Clone, Conflict, Oi Polloi, Sin Dios, Propagandhi, Citizen Fish, Bus Station Loonies etc. Many other bands, especially at the local level of unsigned groups, have taken on what is known as a "punk" or "DIY" ethic: that is, Doing It Yourself, indeed a popular Anarcho-punk slogan reads "DIY not EMI", a reference to a conscious rejection of the major record company. Some groups who began as 'anarcho-punk' have attempted to move their ideas into a more mainstream musical arena, for instance, Chumbawamba, who continue to support and promote anarchist politics despite now playing more dance music and pop influenced styles. The Folk Punk genre also heavily explores anarchist ideas in an inherently DIY fashion. Pat the Bunny, Ramshackle Glory, The Taxpayers, Mischief Brew, and Days N Daze are examples of thematically anarchist folk punk bands.

Techno music is also connected strongly to anarchists and eco-anarchists, as many of the events playing these types of music are self-organised and put on in contravention of national laws. Sometimes doors are pulled off empty warehouses and the insides transformed into illegal clubs with cheap (or free) entrance, types of music not heard elsewhere and quite often an abundance of different drugs. Other raves may be held outside, and are viewed negatively by the authorities. In the UK, the Criminal Justice Bill (1994) outlawed these events (raves) and brought together a coalition of socialists, ravers and direct actionists who opposed the introduction of this 'draconian' Act of Parliament by having a huge 'party&protest' in the Centre of London that descended into one of the largest riots of the 1990s in Britain. Digital hardcore, an electronic music genre, is also overtly anarchist; Atari Teenage Riot is the most widely recognized digital hardcore band. Both Digital Hardcore, Techno and related genres are not the sole preserve of anarchists; people of many musical, political or recreational persuasions are involved in these musical scenes.

Heavy metal bands such as Sweden's Arch Enemy and Germany's Kreator have also embraced anarchistic themes in their lyrics and imagery. The genre of folk punk or "radical folk" has become increasingly prevalent in protest culture, with artists like David Rovics openly asserting anarchist beliefs. Negativland's The ABCs of Anarchism includes a reading of material from Alexander Berkman's Now and After and other anarchist-related material in a sound collage. Spichard Rencer is a notable anarchist Powerviolence group from Tampa, Florida.

Paul Gailiunas and his late wife Helen Hill co-wrote the anarchist song "Emma Goldman", which was performed by the band Piggy: The Calypso Orchestra of the Maritimes and released on their 1999 album Don't Stop the Calypso: Songs of Love and Liberation. After Helen and Paul moved to New Orleans, Paul started a new band called The Troublemakers and re-released the song "Emma Goldman" on their 2004 album Here Come The Troublemakers. Proclaiming the motto "It's your duty as a citizen to troublemake," other songs on the album include "International Flag Burning Day."

The Charter of the Forest, which invented the genre of "Read-Opera," is a combination poetic-musical work which espouses anarchist ideas of opposition to hierarchy, as well as being highly influenced by a Tolstoyan commitment to nonviolence.

Artists and artworks inspired by anarchism

Visual arts 

 Christopher D'Arcangelo
 Enrico Baj (Funeral Of The Anarchist Pinelli)
 Beehive Collective
 Carlo Carrà (The Funeral of the Anarchist Galli)
 Carlos Cortez
 Flavio Costantini
 Eric Drooker
 Marcel Duchamp
 Mike Flugennock
 Clifford Harper
 Stewart Home
 Donald Judd
 Wassily Kandinsky
 James Koehnline
 Latuff
 Josh MacPhee

 Louis Moreau
 Arthur Moyse
 Paul Signac
 Georges Seurat
 Walter Swennen
 Gustave Courbet
 Juan Gris
 Barnett Newman
 Richard Olmsted
 Roberto Paci Dalò
 Stass Paraskos
 Francis Picabia
 Camille Pissarro
 Sigmar Polke
 José Guadalupe Posada
 Mark Rothko
 Winston Smith
 Seth Tobocman
 Vladimir Tatlin
 Gee Vaucher
 David Chichkan
 Lee Wells
 Avoid pi

Comics and sequential art 

 J. Daniels
 The Adventures of Tintin: Breaking Free
 Roberto Ambrosoli
 Anarchik
 Alan Grant
 Anarky
 Batman: Anarky
 Jay Kinney
 Anarchy Comics

 Alan Moore
 V for Vendetta
 Grant Morrison
 The Invisibles
 Donald Rooum
 Wildcat Comics, see the British newspaper Freedom
 Chaz Wood
 The Black Flag (Graphic novel)

Music 

 Georges Brassens
 Léo Ferré
 Amour Anarchie
 Il n'y a plus rien
 La Violence et l'Ennui
 Étienne Roda-Gil
 La Makhnovtchina

Prose 

 Edward Abbey
 The Brave Cowboy
 Good News
 The Monkey Wrench Gang
 Isaac Babel
 Discourse on the "Tachanka", Collected Stories
 Old man Makhno
 Iain M. Banks
 The Culture series
 Don Bannister
 Hard Walls of Ego
 Ralph Bates
 Lean Men (1934)
 Alexander Berkman
 Prison Memoirs of an Anarchist [1912]
 Horst Bienek
 Bakunin: An Invention (1970)
 André Breton
 Albert Camus
 Joseph Conrad
 The Secret Agent (1907)
 Stig Dagerman
 Samuel R. Delany
 Trouble on Triton: An Ambiguous Heterotopia (1976)
 Philip K. Dick
 The Last of the Masters (1954)
 E L Doctorow
 Ragtime (1975)
 Martin B. Duberman
 Haymarket (2003)
 Greg Egan
 Dario Fo
 Accidental Death of an Anarchist
 William Godwin
 Caleb Williams (1794)
 Pietro Gori
 Primo Maggio (1895)
 Frank Harris
 The Bomb (1908)
 M. John Harrison
 Jaroslav Hašek
 The Good Soldier Švejk
 Robert A. Heinlein
 The Moon Is a Harsh Mistress
 Max Hertzberg
 Stealing The Future
 Henry James
 The Princess Casamassima (1886)
 Ba Jin
 The Family (1931)
 Maurice Leblanc
 Arsène Lupin books were inspired by Marius Jacob
 Ursula K. Le Guin
 The Dispossessed Emanuel Litvinoff
 A Death Out Of Season J. William Lloyd
 John Henry Mackay
 Der Schwimmer (1901)

 Ken MacLeod
 Fall Revolution sequence
 Leo Malet
 Fog on the Tolbiac Bridge Ethel Mannin
 Red Rose The Lover Under Another Name Henry Miller
 Tropic of Cancer Michael Moorcock
 George Orwell
 Homage to Catalonia (1938)
 Michael Paraskos
 In Search of Sixpence (2016)
 Émile Pataud (and Émile Pouget)
 How Shall We Bring About The Revolution? (1913)
 Pedro de Paz
 The Man Who Killed Durruti Marge Piercy
 Woman on the Edge of Time Emeric Pressburger
 Killing a Mouse on Sunday Thomas Pynchon
 Against the Day (2006)
 Adam Roberts
 Salt Olivia & Helen Rossetti
 A Girl Among the Anarchists (1903) by Isabel Meredith (fictional memoir)
 Eric Frank Russell
 ...And Then There Were None (also here  and here ) (1951; expanded into novel The Great Explosion, 1962)
 Ramon J. Sender
 Seven Red Sundays (1932)
 Victor Serge
 Birth of our Power Men in Prison Upton Sinclair
 Boston (1928)
 Leo Tolstoy
 J. R. R. Tolkien
 B. Traven
 Government (1931)
 The Carreta (1931)
 March to the Monteria (1933)
 The Troza (1936)
 The Rebellion of the Hanged (1936)
 The General From The Jungle (1940)
 Lois Waisbrooker
 Richard Whiteing
 No. 5 John Street Oscar Wilde
 Robert Anton Wilson
 Illuminatus trilogy Cosmic Trigger I: The Final Secret of the Illuminati Émile Zola
 Germinal (1885)
 The Debacle (1892)

 Poetry 

 Nestor Makhno
 Tony Blackplait
 Sean Bonney
 Raegan Butcher
 Percy Bysshe Shelley
 Voltairine De Cleyre
 Hugo Dewar
 Barcelona (1936)
 Lawrence Ferlinghetti
 Léo Ferré (also singer and musician)
 Pietro Gori
 Sadakichi Hartmann
 Joe Hill
 Philip Lamantia
 Philip Levine
 John Henry Mackay
 Anarchy John Manifold
 Makhno's Philosophers Renzo Novatore
 Kenneth Patchen

 Benjamin Péret
 Diane di Prima
 Herbert Read
 Kenneth Rexroth
 Again at Waldheim Lola Ridge
 Karl Shapiro
 Death of Emma Goldman Gary Snyder
 Ernst Toller
 George Woodcock
 Black Flag Fernando Pessoa
 O Banqueiro Anarquista Television and films 

 Peter Watkins
 Julian Beck
 Actor, director and painter who founded "The Living Theatre" with Judith Malina.
 Kevin Brownlow
 Luis Buñuel
 In particular, his documentary Las Hurdes: Tierra Sin Pan.
 Peter Coyote
 Martin B. Duberman
 Mother Earth: An Epic Drama of Emma Goldman's Life Jon Jost
 Nelly Kaplan
 Adonis Kyrou
 Judith Malina
 Actress who was an integral part of the "Living Theater" with her husband
 Godfrey Reggio
 Jean Vigo
 Yoshishige Yoshida
 Directed Eros Plus Massacre, about anarchists Sakae Ōsugi and Noe Itō.
 Yu Yong-Sik
 Directed Anarchists, about an underground cell of insurrectionary anarchists.

 Theatre/drama 
 Carol Bolt
 Red Emma: Queen of the Anarchists (1974)
 Martin B. Duberman
 Mother Earth: An Epic Drama of Emma Goldman's Life (1991)
 Fredy Perlman
 Illyria Street Commune Tom Stoppard
 The Coast of Utopia (A Trilogy) (2002)
 Howard Zinn
 Emma: A Play in Two Acts about Emma Goldman, American Anarchist'' (2002)

See also 

 Anarchist symbolism
 Anti-art
 Artivist
 List of fictional anarchists

Footnotes and citations

Further reading

External links 
 
 Anarchism, Art, & Critical Mass
 Anarchism & Science Fiction, a bibliography of works of science fiction which feature or were inspired by a theme of anarchism.
 When Gendarme Sleeps – Anarchist Zine of Poetry
 Libertarian Communist Library Arts and Culture Archive
 Notes on the history of anarchism in literature: a chronology
 Parser: New Poetry and Poetics, a journal of anarchist poetry and poetics
 People's history of Culture, a working class and anarchist cultural history page
 Anarchism and Film, a database of anarchist films created by Santiago Juan-Navarro and hosted by ChristieBooks

1857 introductions
Anarchist culture
Anarchist works
Issues in anarchism
Political art